Children's Health Ireland at Crumlin (CHI at Crumlin) in Dublin is Ireland's largest paediatric hospital.

History
The hospital, which was built on land donated by the Archbishop of Dublin, was designed by Robinson Keefe Devane and officially opened as Our Lady's Hospital for Sick Children in 1956.

The hospital changed its name to "Our Lady's Children's Hospital, Crumlin" in 2005.

In November 2012 the Minister for Health James Reilly announced plans to transfer the hospital's services to a new children's hospital on the campus of St. James's Hospital.

In July 2013 concerns were raised about children who underwent a colonoscopy at the hospital between 17 May and 5 July 2013; it was revealed they had been exposed to an infection that could not be cured by antibiotics.

The hospital changed its name from Our Lady's Children's Hospital, Crumlin to Children's Health Ireland at Crumlin as part of the rebranding of three hospitals under the Children's Health Ireland banner on 1 January 2019.

As of late October 2020, the hospital had failed to make several of its clinical trial results public as required by European Union transparency rules.

All-Ireland champions
It is a tradition that All-Ireland champions visit the hospital after the final. When the Dublin senior ladies' football team won the 2019 All-Ireland Senior Ladies' Football Championship Final, the team included Rachel Ruddy who works as a physiotherapist at the hospital. Ruddy hosted her Dublin teammates during their visit.

References

External links
 

Crumlin, Dublin
Hospital buildings completed in 1956
Teaching hospitals in Dublin (city)
Teaching hospitals of the University of Dublin, Trinity College
Health Service Executive hospitals
1956 establishments in Ireland
Catholic hospitals in Europe